Events from the year 1986 in Italy

Incumbents
 President: Francesco Cossiga
 Prime Minister: Bettino Craxi

Events
 10 February - The Maxi Trial, a criminal trial against the Sicilian Mafia begins in Palermo, Sicily.

Births
26 January –  Alessio Ferrazza, Italian footballer
12 August – Chiara Galiazzo, singer

Deaths

See also
 1986 in Italian television
 List of Italian films of 1986

References 

 
1980s in Italy
Years of the 20th century in Italy
Italy
Italy